Aleksandra Kruk (born 29 October 1984 in Elbląg) is a Polish volleyball player. She was part of the Poland women's national volleyball team.

She participated in the 2011 FIVB Volleyball World Grand Prix.
On club level she played for AZS Bialystok in 2012.

References

External links

 Aleksandra Kruk at the International Volleyball Federation
  (archive)
 http://www.pzps.pl/en///78/tourPlayers,id,2308,stageId,131.html

1984 births
Living people
Polish women's volleyball players
People from Elbląg